The 2016 Sports Direct BDO World Trophy is a major darts tournament run by the British Darts Organisation, hosted between 28–30 May 2016 at Lakeside Leisure Complex, Frimley Green, Surrey. This event is organized by the British Darts Organisation.

Darryl Fitton won the men's title for the first time, while Lisa Ashton retained the women's title she won the previous year.

Prize Fund
Winner     £20,000 (men), £4,000 (women)
Runner Up  £10,000 (men), £2,000 (women)
Joint 3rd  2 x £5,000 (men), 2 x £1,500 (women)
Joint 5th  4 x £2,500 (men), 4 x £1,250 (women)
Joint 9th  8 x £1,500 (men), 8 x £1,000 (women)	
Joint 17th  16 x £1,000 (men)	
Totals £150.000 (£78,000 men, £22,000 women) Nine dart check-out £50,000

Qualifiers

Men

Draw

Men

Women

Draw

Television coverage
The event is live on UKTV channel Dave. The Winmau website will show live coverage of all three days.

References

BDO World Trophy
BDO World Trophy
BDO World Trophy
Frimley Green
BDO World Trophy